HD 43899, also designated as HR 2263, is a solitary, orange hued star located in the southern constellation Columba, the dove. It has an apparent magnitude of 5.53, allowing it to be faintly visible to the naked eye. Based on parallax measurements from the Gaia spacecraft, the object is estimated to be 284 light years distant. Eggen (1993) lists HD 43899 as an old disk star and its kinematics match with that of the ζ Herculis moving group.

HD 43899 is an evolved giant star that is currently on the horizontal branch, a red clump star, fusing a hydrogen shell around an inert helium core. It has a stellar classification of K2 III. At the age of 6.32 billion years, it has already left the main sequence and now radiates 61 times the luminosity of the Sun from an enlarged photosphere 12.4 times that of the sun. HD 43899 has an iron abundance 24% below solar levels, making it slightly metal deficient.

References

K-type giants
High-proper-motion stars
Columba (constellation)
Columbae, 86
043899
CD-37 02707
029842
2263
Zeta Herculis Moving Group